Whaleback may refer to:

 a whaleback, a type of steamship
 a type of tender in rail transport
 an alternate name for a bornhardt
 an alternate name for a roche moutonnée
 the back of a whale

Antarctica
 the Whaleback Rocks, off the coast of Antarctica

in Australia
 Mount Whaleback, in Australia
 the Mount Whaleback mine, in Australia
 a golf course in Parkwood, Western Australia

in Canada
Whaleback Mountain, in Yoho National Park 

in England
 a terrace outside the hamlet of Yeavering, in Northumberland

in the United States
 the "Whale's Back", a section of Maine State Route 9
 the Whaleback Shell Midden, an archaeological site in Maine
 the Whaleback Light, a lighthouse at the mouth of the Piscataqua River between Maine and New Hampshire
 Whaleback (California), a mountain ridge in Kings Canyon National Park
 the Whaleback, an 8,528 ft (2,599 m) volcanic mountain in the Cascade Range 6 miles (10 km) north of Mount Shasta in far northern California's Klamath National Forest
 Whaleback (ski area), a recreation area on Whaleback Mountain in New Hampshire
Whaleback Mountain (Oregon), location of the Whaleback Snow-Survey Cabin listed on the National Register of Historic Places
 a lava spine which existed in the crater of Mount St. Helens, Washington, from 2004 to 2005